Böhler, is an Austrian trader for special steel. Its multinational presence includes locations around the world, including the Americas, Europe, Asia and Africa.

Böhler concentrates in very specific grades of steel, requiring great strength, strict tolerances and high quality. Such uses include components for heavy machinery, and other high-technology roles.

External links
 Global site

Steel companies of Austria